Akopov is a Russian-origin surname. People with the surname include:

 Alexander Akopov (born 1970), Russian painter
 Petr Akopov, Russian propagandist 
 Stepan Akopov (1899–1958), Soviet engineer and politician 

Surnames of Russian origin